Daydream Solar Farm is a photovoltaic power station developed by Edify Energy in Springlands, Whitsunday Region, Queensland, Australia. It uses a single-axis tracking system to follow the sun across the sky. It generates up to 180MW DC and  150MW AC.

Powerlink upgraded its transmission network to connect the Hayman and Daydream solar farms to the grid.

Daydream has a 12-year power purchase agreement to provide electricity to Origin Energy.

References

Solar power stations in Queensland